Indre Nørrebro (lit. English, "Inner Nørrebro"), is one of the 15 administrative, statistical, and tax city districts (bydele) comprising the municipality of Copenhagen, Denmark.  It covers an area of 1.72 km², has a population of 31,046 and a population density of 18,057 per km², making it the second most densely populated district in Copenhagen.

Neighboring city districts are as follows:
 to the southeast is the Indre By, also known as "Copenhagen Center" or "Downtown Copenhagen" or "City", separated from Indre Nørrebro by the "lakes" (Skt. Jørgens Lake, Peblinge Lake, and Sortedams Lake)
 to the northeast is Indre Østerbro
 to the northwest is Ydre Nørrebro
 to the southwest is Frederiksberg municipality, which is not a part of Copenhagen municipality but rather an enclave surrounded by the municipality

Colloquially, the Indre Nørrebro and the Ydre Nørrebro are collectively referred to as Nørrebro.

Attractions 
 Assistens Cemetery (Assistens Kirkegård)
 Blågårds Plads
 Nørrebro Street (Nørrebrogade)

External links 
 City of Copenhagen’s statistical office

Copenhagen city districts